Miracle Beach (released in the Philippines as Genie, My Love and subtitled Hardbodies II in Australia) is a 1992 fantasy/comedy film starring Dean Cameron, Ami Dolenz, Felicity Waterman and Pat Morita.

Plot
Scotty McKay (Cameron) is just an everyday beach-bum who used to have it all, when he finds an attractive genie named Jeannie (Dolenz).  Her mission is to assist Scotty. With Jeannie's help, Scotty has everything again and more, as Jeannie does his bidding and answers to his every beck and call; that is until he asks Jeannie to make him more desirable to the next door supermodel, Dana (Felicity Waterman).

Jeannie can't help as far as love is concerned, and besides, Dana is just not interested. Jeannie soon runs into problems when she finds herself attracted to Scotty and finds it difficult to help him win Dana's heart. 

When Dana starts cheating with her ex, Scott is convinced by Jeannie to make Dana jealous by wishing her visible to others as his lover. Scotty starts seeing Jeannie's love for him and begins ignoring Dana. Scott ultimately decides to choose Jeannie, whom becomes human after his declaration of love; as genie couldn't declare her love first due to the same magic.

Cast
 Dean Cameron as Scotty McKay
 Ami Dolenz as Jeannie
 Felicity Waterman as Dana
 Pat Morita as Gus
 Allen Garfield as Magnus O'Leary
 Alexis Arquette as Lars
 Martin Mull as Donald Burbank
 Vincent Schiavelli as Mystic
 Dean Cain as Volleyball Player #1
 Frances Buchsbaum as Scotty's grandmother
 Johnny Cocktails as Mac
 Cecile Krevoy as Scotty's mother
 Brian Perry as Soup
 Gary Grant as himself

Release
Miracle Beach was released direct-to-video on VHS by Sony Pictures Home Entertainment on September 30, 1992. In the Philippines, the film was released in theaters as Genie, My Love on October 20, 1992; it was marketed as "suitable for the whole family".

It was released on the MGM Limited Edition Collection on November 17, 2015. It was released on Blu-ray by Kino Lorber on April 19, 2016.

References

External links
 

1992 films
1992 romantic comedy films
1992 direct-to-video films
American fantasy comedy films
Films about wish fulfillment
Films shot in Los Angeles
Genies in film
Teen sex comedy films
1990s English-language films
1990s American films